Winslow Marine Railway and Shipbuilding Company was a shipyard in Puget Sound that operated from 1903 until 1959 on Bainbridge Island, Washington, United States.

The shipyard was built as an expansion of Hall Bros. Marine Railway & Shipbuilding Company of Port Blakely, Washington, on  near the village of Madrone, later renamed Winslow after the dead brother of shipyard owner Henry Hall. It built five-masted schooners whose design allowed cargo to be loaded both fore and aft. Different facilities were included in this yard. It were marine railway, a powerhouse, sawmill, joiner loft, warehouse, shipways.

In 1916, Hall sold the Winslow yard to Captain James Griffiths, who renamed it Winslow Marine Railway & Shipbuilding Co. The following year, Griffiths leased the yard to D. W. Hartzel, Inc., which used the facility to install machinery in hulls built at other yards.

After World War I, Griffiths retook control of the yard, using it to do repair work for Puget Sound's ferry operators. During World War II, the yard built steel minesweepers, employing as many as 2,300 workers.

Griffiths sold the yard in 1948, and its new owners renamed it Commercial Ship Repair of Winslow. Business dwindled, and the yard closed in 1959.  The property was divided into a marina, an apartment complex and a Washington State Ferries maintenance facility.

Ships built for the United States Navy during World War II

 4 of 95 s (ca. 1943)
  ... 
 16 of 123 s (ca. 1944)
  ... 
  ... 
 Yard tug YTL-571 to YTL-574

See also

 Seattle-Tacoma Shipbuilding Corporation#Shipbuilding in Puget Sound
James Griffiths & Sons, Inc.

References

Shipyards of the United States
Defunct shipbuilding companies of the United States
Industrial buildings and structures in Washington (state)
Shipbuilding in Washington (state)